Stadion Aleksandar Shalamanov is a multi-purpose stadium in the Slavia district of Sofia, Bulgaria named after the football legend Aleksandar Shalamanov. It is currently used for football matches and is the home ground of the local football club PFC Slavia Sofia. The stadium has a seating capacity of 25,556 and is one of the biggest sport facilities in Bulgaria.
The stadium is part of a multifunctional sport complex, which includes two football training grounds, one multi-purpose indoor hall and an ice-hockey arena with a capacity of 2,000 spectators.
Also, as of 2009, the Bulgaria national under-21 football team plays some of its home matches at this stadium.

In April 2014, a contract for building a new stadium to replace the old one was signed between PFC Slavia and the German company IFS. The capacity shall be expanded to 24,000, with an option for 33,000 spectators for major events. The deal was co-signed by the Bulgarian Football Union. The national teams shall be obliged to play their host matches at the new stadium. Also, the football union will bid with this stadium for a standard package of Euro 2020 matches.

On 25 October 2021, a day after  Slavia's legend Aleksandar Shalamanov died, the team announced that the stadium would be renamed in his honour and would take the name Aleksandar Shalamanov Stadium.

Old Slavia Stadium
The original home ground of Slavia was located just to the northwest of Ruski Pametnik near the center of Sofia. It was built in the mid-1920s and demolished in the late 1940s.

References

Football venues in Bulgaria
Sports venues in Sofia
Multi-purpose stadiums in Bulgaria
Stadium